Adil Nurmemet (born February 1968) is a former Chinese politician of Uighur ethnicity. He was the Mayor of Hotan, an important city in the Xinjiang interior, between 2009 and 2013. He was investigated by the Communist Party of China's anti-graft agency in October 2014.

Career
Adili Nurmemet was born and raised in Hotan, Xinjiang Uyghur Autonomous Region.

He joined the Communist Party of China in June 1989 and got involved in politics in July 1989.

In January 2009, he was appointed the Mayor and Deputy Communist Party Secretary of Hotan (the county-level city, not the eponymous prefecture), he remained in that position until October 2014, when he was being investigated by the Party's internal disciplinary body for "serious violations of laws and regulations".

Adili was expelled from the Communist Party on February 17, 2015. On June 19, he was indicted on suspicion of accepting bribes. The public prosecutors accused him of abusing his multiple positions between 2007 and 2013 in Hetian to seek favor on behalf of certain organizations and individuals in settlement of project funds, land development and real estate construction. In return, he took bribes of more than 6.44 million yuan ($989,440).

He was sentenced to 12 years for accepting bribes about 6.44 million yuan ($989,440).

References

1968 births
Chinese Communist Party politicians from Xinjiang
Living people
Political office-holders in Xinjiang
Expelled members of the Chinese Communist Party
People's Republic of China politicians from Xinjiang
People from Hotan